2009 Emperor's Cup Final was the 89th final of the Emperor's Cup competition. The final was played at National Stadium in Tokyo on January 1, 2010. Gamba Osaka won the championship.

Match details

See also
2009 Emperor's Cup

References

Emperor's Cup
2009 in Japanese football
Gamba Osaka matches
Nagoya Grampus matches